The 2006–07 New Jersey Nets season was the team's 40th in the NBA. They began the season hoping to improve upon their 49–33 output from the previous season. However, they came eight wins shy of tying it, finishing 41–41. In the playoffs, the Nets upset Vince Carter's former team, the Toronto Raptors in the first round but could not defeat the eventual Eastern Conference champion, the LeBron James-led Cleveland Cavaliers in the next round. The Nets remain the last team with a 0.500 record to win a playoff series. The Nets had the thirteenth best team defensive rating in the NBA.

This season marked the Nets' final playoff appearance in New Jersey, and the Nets would not return to the playoffs until 2013, when they relocated to Brooklyn, New York.

Draft picks

Roster

Regular season

Record vs. opponents

Playoffs

|- align="center" bgcolor="#ccffcc"
| 1
| April 21
| @ Toronto
| W 96–91
| Richard Jefferson (28)
| Jason Kidd (10)
| Jason Kidd (15)
| Air Canada Centre20,330
| 1–0
|- align="center" bgcolor="#ffcccc"
| 2
| April 24
| @ Toronto
| L 83–89
| Vince Carter (19)
| Kidd, Carter (11)
| Jason Kidd (7)
| Air Canada Centre20,239
| 1–1
|- align="center" bgcolor="#ccffcc"
| 3
| April 27
| Toronto
| W 102–89
| Vince Carter (37)
| Jason Kidd (16)
| Jason Kidd (19)
| Continental Airlines Arena17,147
| 2–1
|- align="center" bgcolor="#ccffcc"
| 4
| April 29
| Toronto
| W 102–81
| Vince Carter (27)
| Jason Kidd (8)
| Jason Kidd (13)
| Continental Airlines Arena20,032
| 3–1
|- align="center" bgcolor="#ffcccc"
| 5
| May 1
| @ Toronto
| L 96–98
| Vince Carter (30)
| Mikki Moore (10)
| Jason Kidd (10)
| Air Canada Centre20,511
| 3–2
|- align="center" bgcolor="#ccffcc"
| 6
| May 4
| Toronto
| W 98–97
| Richard Jefferson (24)
| Kidd, Moore (8)
| Jason Kidd (15)
| Continental Airlines Arena17,242
| 4–2
|-

|- align="center" bgcolor="#ffcccc"
| 1
| May 6
| @ Cleveland
| L 77–81
| Vince Carter (21)
| Vince Carter (13)
| Jason Kidd (9)
| Quicken Loans Arena20,562
| 0–1
|- align="center" bgcolor="#ffcccc"
| 2
| May 8
| @ Cleveland
| L 92–102
| Vince Carter (26)
| Jason Kidd (10)
| Jason Kidd (8)
| Quicken Loans Arena20,562
| 0–2
|- align="center" bgcolor="#ccffcc"
| 3
| May 12
| Cleveland
| W 96–85
| three players tied (23)
| Jason Kidd (13)
| Jason Kidd (14)
| Continental Airlines Arena20,032
| 1–2
|- align="center" bgcolor="#ffcccc"
| 4
| May 14
| Cleveland
| L 85–87
| Carter, Moore (25)
| Jason Kidd (17)
| Vince Carter (9)
| Continental Airlines Arena20,032
| 1–3
|- align="center" bgcolor="#ccffcc"
| 5
| May 16
| @ Cleveland
| W 83–72
| Jason Kidd (20)
| Jason Kidd (9)
| Vince Carter (10)
| Quicken Loans Arena20,562
| 2–3
|- align="center" bgcolor="#ffcccc"
| 6
| May 18
| Cleveland
| L 72–88
| Jason Kidd (19)
| Jason Kidd (12)
| Jason Kidd (8)
| Continental Airlines Arena20,032
| 2–4
|-

Player statistics

Regular season 

|-
| 
| 61 || 8 || 8.1 || .556 || .000 || .667 || 1.3 || .2 || .3 || .1 || 2.9
|-
| 
| 61 || 0 || 11.0 || .579 || . || .544 || 2.9 || .2 || .2 || .3 || 4.2
|-
| 
| style=";"| 82 || style=";"| 82 || style=";"| 38.1 || .454 || .357 || .802 || 6.0 || 4.8 || 1.0 || .4 || style=";"| 25.2
|-
| 
| 80 || 78 || 23.1 || .364 || .000 || .465 || 4.0 || .6 || .5 || .5 || 2.1
|-
| 
| 56 || 1 || 16.9 || .428 || style=";"| .429 || style=";"| .917 || 1.6 || 1.2 || .5 || .1 || 8.4
|-
| 
| 5 || 0 || 1.2 || .000 || . || . || .2 || .0 || .0 || .0 || .0
|-
| 
| 55 || 53 || 35.6 || .456 || .359 || .733 || 4.4 || 2.7 || .6 || .1 || 16.3
|-
| 
| 80 || 80 || 36.7 || .406 || .343 || .778 || style=";"| 8.2 || style=";"| 9.2 || style=";"| 1.6 || .3 || 13.0
|-
| 
| 26 || 26 || 32.6 || .526 || .000 || .711 || 6.8 || 1.8 || .4 || style=";"| .9 || 16.4
|-
| 
| 79 || 55 || 26.4 || style=";"| .609 || .000 || .681 || 5.1 || .9 || .6 || .8 || 9.8
|-
| 
| 10 || 0 || 3.7 || .375 || . || .800 || .6 || .2 || .4 || .1 || 1.0
|-
| 
| 50 || 11 || 19.1 || .372 || .379 || .444 || 2.4 || 1.0 || .2 || .5 || 4.1
|-
| 
| 79 || 2 || 16.6 || .395 || .282 || .847 || 2.1 || 3.3 || .4 || .0 || 6.8
|-
| 
| 63 || 23 || 18.0 || .438 || .322 || .603 || 2.8 || .9 || .5 || .2 || 4.5
|}

Playoffs 

|-
| 
| 6 || 0 || 1.5 || .500 || . || . || .2 || .0 || .0 || .0 || .3
|-
| 
| style=";"| 12 || 0 || 9.8 || .500 || . || .500 || 1.6 || .3 || .1 || .3 || 3.0
|-
| 
| style=";"| 12 || style=";"| 12 || 40.6 || .396 || .389 || .693 || 6.8 || 5.3 || .9 || style=";"| .6 || style=";"| 22.3
|-
| 
| style=";"| 12 || style=";"| 12 || 27.4 || style=";"| .571 || . || .364 || 3.3 || .2 || .6 || .3 || 2.3
|-
| 
| 4 || 0 || 4.5 || .250 || .167 || . || .5 || .3 || .3 || .0 || 1.3
|-
| 
| style=";"| 12 || style=";"| 12 || style=";"| 40.8 || .482 || .325 || .924 || 5.6 || 2.3 || .8 || .4 || 19.7
|-
| 
| style=";"| 12 || style=";"| 12 || 40.3 || .432 || .420 || .520 || style=";"| 10.9 || style=";"| 10.9 || style=";"| 1.8 || .4 || 14.6
|-
| 
| style=";"| 12 || style=";"| 12 || 33.3 || .560 || . || .793 || 5.6 || 1.2 || .8 || style=";"| .6 || 11.3
|-
| 
| style=";"| 12 || 0 || 23.4 || .421 || .375 || style=";"| .955 || 2.9 || 1.5 || .6 || .1 || 9.9
|-
| 
| 1 || 0 || 6.0 || .000 || . || . || 1.0 || 2.0 || 1.0 || .0 || .0
|-
| 
| 4 || 0 || 5.0 || .167 || style=";"| .500 || . || .0 || .0 || .3 || .0 || .8
|-
| 
| style=";"| 12 || 0 || 6.5 || .333 || .077 || .800 || .8 || 1.1 || .1 || .0 || 2.4
|-
| 
| style=";"| 12 || 0 || 13.6 || .472 || style=";"| .500 || .900 || 1.9 || .1 || .4 || .3 || 3.8
|}

Transactions

Trades

Free Agents

References

New Jersey Nets season
New Jersey Nets seasons
New Jersey Nets
New Jersey Nets
21st century in East Rutherford, New Jersey
Meadowlands Sports Complex